Diverted is a 2009 CBC made-for-TV miniseries. The film was directed by Alex Chapple based on the screenplay by Tony Marchant. Diverted is a fictionalized account inspired by what actually happened to the people of Gander, Newfoundland, and the passengers and crews on the airliners diverted by the Federal Aviation Administration (FAA) during the 9/11 attacks in Operation Yellow Ribbon.

Plot
On September 11, 2001, as information seeps out about the 9/11 attacks on the US, the FAA begins directing all remaining aircraft in the air to nearby airports, completely clearing the skies. A total of 38 transatlantic flights at or near their "point of no return" (also known as the "point of safe return") are diverted to the nearest airport in Canada, Gander, Newfoundland. The anxious passengers leaving on business and vacation trips have no idea why their flights are being sent to a remote town in Canada. With wild rumours spreading, one British airliner's crew tells the passengers what is known, that a terrorist attack has taken place in the United States.

Personal stories emerge, with Mike Stiven (Shawn Ashmore), the air traffic controller at Gander meeting and falling in love with Alia Ramaswami (Anita Majumdar), a woman on one of the diverted airliners. Like many other passengers, New Yorker Samuel Stearn (David Suchet) is desperate to contact his son, who was in the World Trade Center. Marion Price (Joanne Whalley) and Andrew Tyler (Colin Buchanan) are other passengers who are brought together by their shared experiences.

The town of Gander mobilizes in Operation Yellow Ribbon to welcome the stranded passengers and crews, finding food and accommodations for everyone. Even years later, the connection between the stranded European and American travellers with their Canadian hosts remains strong.

Cast

Production

Of the total of 200 aircraft flying over the Atlantic at the time of the 9/11 attacks, 38 flights were diverted to Gander, bringing 6,600 passengers and crew to a town of 9,000. Diverted was filmed during 2008 in the locations where the events occurred, including Gander, as well as St. John's, Newfoundland, Hamilton, Ontario, and London where many of the flights originated.

Reception
Diverted was shown as a mini-series on the Canadian Broadcasting Corporation (CBC) network. Critics noted the personal stories were interesting, but the slow pace of the production bogged it down. Reviewer David Nusair commented, "There's little doubt that Diverted, despite the inherently compelling nature of its premise, never quite becomes anything more than a mildly watchable movie-of-the-week …" Gander's story, even though fictionalized, did make a difference for British reviewer Andy Webb: "… alongside these various storylines about the passengers and friendships it also delivers a heart warming story."

Awards and honours
At the 2009 Gemini Awards, David Suchet won for Best Performance by an Actor in a Leading Role in a Dramatic Program or Mini-Series. Tony Marchant was also nominated for a 2009 Gemini in the category, Best Writing in a Dramatic Program or Mini-Series.

Director Alex Chapple was nominated for the 2009 DGC Craft Award (Direction - Television Movie/Mini-Series) from the Directors Guild of Canada.

See also
Come from Away
You Are Here, 2018 documentary film

References

External links
 CBC Program Guide - Diverted
 

2009 television films
2009 films
Canadian drama television films
CBC Television original films
Canadian aviation films
English-language Canadian films
Films based on the September 11 attacks
Films set in airports
Films set in Newfoundland and Labrador
2000s Canadian films